The 2005 Under-18 European Promotion Cup for Women was the fifth edition of the basketball European Promotion Cup for U18 women's teams, today known as FIBA U18 Women's European Championship Division C. It was played in Scotland from 11 to 16 July 2005. The host team, Scotland, won the tournament.

Participating teams

First round

Group A

Group B

5th–8th place playoffs

5th–8th place semifinals

7th place match

5th place match

Championship playoffs

Semifinals

3rd place match

Final

Final standings

References

2005
2005–06 in European women's basketball
FIBA U18
Sports competitions in Scotland
FIBA